Marcelo Cabezas (born 5 April 1945) is an Ecuadorian former footballer. He played in three matches for the Ecuador national football team in 1975. He was also part of Ecuador's squad for the 1975 Copa América tournament.

References

External links
 

1945 births
Living people
Ecuadorian footballers
Ecuador international footballers
Place of birth missing (living people)
Association football midfielders
C.D. El Nacional footballers